Garwood is a borough in Union County, in the U.S. state of New Jersey. As of the 2020 United States census, the borough's population was 4,454, an increase of 228 (+5.4%) from the 2010 census count of 4,226, which in turn reflected an increase of 73 (+1.8%) from the 4,153 counted in the 2000 census.

History
Garwood was incorporated as a borough on March 19, 1903, from portions of Cranford and Westfield Town.

Geography
According to the United States Census Bureau, the borough had a total area of 0.65 square miles (1.68 km2), all of which was land.

The borough is roughly bisected by the tracks of NJ Transit's Raritan Valley Line, originally built as part of the Jersey Central railroad. On the north side of the railroad, most of the streets are numbered, while on the south side of Garwood most of the streets are named after trees.

Garwood borders the Union County municipalities of Cranford and Westfield.

Demographics

2010 census

The Census Bureau's 2006–2010 American Community Survey showed that (in 2010 inflation-adjusted dollars) median household income was $72,254 (with a margin of error of +/− $9,274) and the median family income was $86,959 (+/− $8,603). Males had a median income of $58,258 (+/− $3,197) versus $43,455 (+/− $3,625) for females. The per capita income for the borough was $35,753 (+/− $2,821). About 0.9% of families and 1.8% of the population were below the poverty line, including none of those under age 18 and none of those age 65 or over.

2000 census
As of the 2000 United States census there were 4,153 people, 1,731 households, and 1,125 families residing in the borough. The population density was 6,292.9 people per square mile (2,429.5/km2). There were 1,782 housing units at an average density of 2,700.2 per square mile (1,042.5/km2). The racial makeup of the borough was 95.91% White, 0.36% African American, 1.32% Asian, 1.54% from other races, and 0.87% from two or more races. Hispanic or Latino of any race were 4.98% of the population.

There were 1,731 households, out of which 26.2% had children under the age of 18 living with them, 49.0% were married couples living together, 12.1% had a female householder with no husband present, and 35.0% were non-families. 28.7% of all households were made up of individuals, and 11.5% had someone living alone who was 65 years of age or older. The average household size was 2.40 and the average family size was 2.96.

In the borough the population was spread out, with 20.0% under the age of 18, 6.3% from 18 to 24, 35.6% from 25 to 44, 20.9% from 45 to 64, and 17.2% who were 65 years of age or older. The median age was 38 years. For every 100 females, there were 93.3 males. For every 100 females age 18 and over, there were 89.6 males.

The median income for a household in the borough was $52,571, and the median income for a family was $64,053. Males had a median income of $50,951 versus $36,538 for females. The per capita income for the borough was $26,944. About 3.5% of families and 5.1% of the population were below the poverty line, including 6.3% of those under age 18 and 6.4% of those age 65 or over.

Government

Local government
Garwood is governed under the Borough form of New Jersey municipal government, which is used in 218 municipalities (of the 564) statewide, making it the most common form of government in New Jersey. The governing body is comprised of the Mayor and the Borough Council, with all positions elected at-large on a partisan basis as part of the November general election. The Mayor is elected directly by the voters to a four-year term of office. The Borough Council is comprised of six members elected to serve three-year terms on a staggered basis, with two seats coming up for election each year in a three-year cycle. The Borough form of government used by Garwood is a "weak mayor / strong council" government in which council members act as the legislative body with the mayor presiding at meetings and voting only in the event of a tie. The mayor can veto ordinances subject to an override by a two-thirds majority vote of the council. The mayor makes committee and liaison assignments for council members, and most appointments are made by the mayor with the advice and consent of the council.

, the Mayor of Garwood is Democrat Jen Blumenstock, whose term of office ends December 31, 2026. Members of the Garwood Borough Council are Russell Graham (D, 2023), Vincent Kearney (D, 2023), Marc Lazarow (D, 2022), Rachel Herz (R, 2024; appointed to serve an unexpired term), Clarissa Nolde (D, 2025) and Kimberly Salmon (R, 2024).

In December 2022, the borough council appointed Rachel Herz to fill the seat expiring in December 2024 that had been held by Louis Petruzzelli, who served briefly before resigning. Petruzzelli had been appointed to fill the seat that had originally been held by Heather Loffredo until she stepped down from office in September 2022.

In January 2019, the Borough Council selected Russell Graham from a list of three candidates nominated by the Democratic municipal committee to fill the seat expiring in December 2020 that became vacant when Sara Todisco took office as mayor. Graham served on an interim basis until the November 2019 general election, when he was elected to serve the balance of the term of office.

The Borough Administrator is Kyle Harris. The Borough Clerk is Catherine D. Cameron.

Federal, state, and county representation
Garwood is located in the 10th Congressional District and is part of New Jersey's 21st state legislative district.

 

Union County is governed by a Board of County Commissioners, whose nine members are elected at-large to three-year terms of office on a staggered basis with three seats coming up for election each year, with an appointed County Manager overseeing the day-to-day operations of the county. At an annual reorganization meeting held in the beginning of January, the board selects a Chair and Vice Chair from among its members. , Union County's County Commissioners are 
Chair Rebecca Williams (D, Plainfield, term as commissioner and as chair ends December 31, 2022), 
Vice Chair Christopher Hudak (D, Linden, term as commissioner ends 2023; term as vice chair ends 2022),
James E. Baker Jr. (D, Rahway, 2024),
Angela R. Garretson (D, Hillside, 2023),
Sergio Granados (D, Elizabeth, 2022),
Bette Jane Kowalski (D, Cranford, 2022), 
Lourdes M. Leon (D, Elizabeth, 2023),
Alexander Mirabella (D, Fanwood, 2024) and 
Kimberly Palmieri-Mouded (D, Westfield, 2024).
Constitutional officers elected on a countywide basis are
County Clerk Joanne Rajoppi (D, Union Township, 2025),
Sheriff Peter Corvelli (D, Kenilworth, 2023) and
Surrogate Susan Dinardo (acting).
The County Manager is Edward Oatman.

Politics
As of March 2011, there were a total of 2,685 registered voters in Garwood, of which 796 (29.6% vs. 41.8% countywide) were registered as Democrats, 496 (18.5% vs. 15.3%) were registered as Republicans and 1,393 (51.9% vs. 42.9%) were registered as Unaffiliated. There were no voters registered to other parties. Among the borough's 2010 Census population, 63.5% (vs. 53.3% in Union County) were registered to vote, including 78.7% of those ages 18 and over (vs. 70.6% countywide).

In the 2012 presidential election, Democrat Barack Obama received 968 votes (48.8% vs. 66.0% countywide), ahead of Republican Mitt Romney with 957 votes (48.2% vs. 32.3%) and other candidates with 38 votes (1.9% vs. 0.8%), among the 1,985 ballots cast by the borough's 2,812 registered voters, for a turnout of 70.6% (vs. 68.8% in Union County). In the 2008 presidential election, Republican John McCain received 1,090 votes (51.6% vs. 35.2% countywide), ahead of Democrat Barack Obama with 971 votes (46.0% vs. 63.1%) and other candidates with 31 votes (1.5% vs. 0.9%), among the 2,111 ballots cast by the borough's 2,782 registered voters, for a turnout of 75.9% (vs. 74.7% in Union County). In the 2004 presidential election, Republican George W. Bush received 995 votes (50.5% vs. 40.3% countywide), ahead of Democrat John Kerry with 928 votes (47.1% vs. 58.3%) and other candidates with 30 votes (1.5% vs. 0.7%), among the 1,970 ballots cast by the borough's 2,539 registered voters, for a turnout of 77.6% (vs. 72.3% in the whole county).

In the 2013 gubernatorial election, Republican Chris Christie received 64.1% of the vote (802 cast), ahead of Democrat Barbara Buono with 34.3% (429 votes), and other candidates with 1.6% (20 votes), among the 1,297 ballots cast by the borough's 2,763 registered voters (46 ballots were spoiled), for a turnout of 46.9%. In the 2009 gubernatorial election, Republican Chris Christie received 823 votes (56.4% vs. 41.7% countywide), ahead of Democrat Jon Corzine with 477 votes (32.7% vs. 50.6%), Independent Chris Daggett with 127 votes (8.7% vs. 5.9%) and other candidates with 18 votes (1.2% vs. 0.8%), among the 1,460 ballots cast by the borough's 2,681 registered voters, yielding a 54.5% turnout (vs. 46.5% in the county).

Emergency services

Police
Garwood's primary law enforcement is the borough's police department, serving the borough since its establishment in 1906. The Garwood Police Department is a small force consisting of Chief of Police James H. Wright, one captain, two lieutenants, two sergeants, ten patrolmen, and four civilian dispatchers. Patrol operations normally consist of one north side car, one south side car, and one supervisor. Officers work 12-hour shifts, four days on, four days off, alternating between days and nights.

EMS
Garwood First Aid Squad serves as the emergency medical service in town. Founded in 1939, it is non-profit service, consists of a dedicated all volunteer staff serving the borough 24 hours per day, seven days a week, at no cost to the residents. Drivers and EMTs on the squad also answer calls for mutual aid when an ambulance is needed in other towns where one is not available. GFAS answers anywhere from 350–400 calls annually.

Fire
Garwood Fire Department is entirely volunteer, and serves the borough in the capacity of fire protection, fire prevention, and fire code enforcement.
The Fire Chief is Allan Tweedle.

Education
The Garwood Public Schools serves students in pre-kindergarten through eighth grade at Lincoln School. As of the 2018–19 school year, the district, comprised of one school, had an enrollment of 386 students and 30.4 classroom teachers (on an FTE basis), for a student–teacher ratio of 12.7:1.

Public school students in ninth through twelfth grades attend Arthur L. Johnson High School in neighboring Clark as part of a sending/receiving relationship with the Clark Public School District. As of the 2018–19 school year, the high school had an enrollment of 717 students and 66.0 classroom teachers (on an FTE basis), for a student–teacher ratio of 10.9:1.

Students from Garwood, and all of Union County, are eligible to attend one of the Union County Vocational Technical Schools.

Transportation

Roads and highways

Route 28 is the main highway through Garwood, connecting east to Cranford and west to Westfield. Route 59, which borders Cranford to the east, has been described as the shortest four-lane paved highway in the United States. It was built in the late 1920s, numbered Route 22 at the time and was originally planned to run from Fairfield Township to Rahway, but was never completed.

Public transportation
The Garwood station offers limited NJ Transit rail service on the Raritan Valley Line.  The station has limited service, does not have platforms and is not ADA compliant.

NJ Transit also provides bus service along two different lines, the 113 route to the Port Authority Bus Terminal in Midtown Manhattan and the 59 bus to Newark.

Newark Liberty International Airport is approximately 15 minutes away. Linden Airport, a general aviation facility is in nearby Linden, New Jersey.

Notable people

People who were born in, residents of, or otherwise closely associated with Garwood include:

 David Durante (born 1980), national men's gymnastics champion
 Loree Jon Hasson (born 1965), professional pool player
 Barry Lubin (born 1952), creator of the clown character "Grandma" of the Big Apple Circus
 John J. McCarthy (1927–2001), politician who served in the New Jersey General Assembly and as Mayor of Garwood
 Tom Perrotta (born 1961), author

References

External links

 Garwood's Official Website

 
1903 establishments in New Jersey
Borough form of New Jersey government
Boroughs in Union County, New Jersey
Populated places established in 1903